João Pedro Carvalho Araújo (born October 20, 1985) is a Portuguese former swimmer, who specialized in freestyle events. He is a single-time Olympian (2004), and a member of GDN Vila Nova de Famalicão, under head coach António Paulo Vasconcelos.

Araujo qualified for the men's 4 × 200 m freestyle relay, as a member of the Portuguese team, at the 2004 Summer Olympics in Athens. Teaming with Luís Monteiro, Adriano Niz, and Miguel Pires in heat one, Araujo swam a third leg in a split of 1:54.50, but the Portuguese team settled only for seventh place and fourteenth overall with a national record of 7:27.99.

References

External links
Profile – Associacion de Natação do Norte de Portugal 

1985 births
Living people
Portuguese male freestyle swimmers
Olympic swimmers of Portugal
Swimmers at the 2004 Summer Olympics
People from Vila Nova de Famalicão
Sportspeople from Braga District